Ninel Miculescu  (born May 15, 1985) is a Romanian weightlifting champion. He is the  European champion of the 69 kg category in 2010.

In late 2011 the International Weightlifting Federation (IWF) banned Ninel Miculescu for life, for the second doping violation.

References

1985 births
Living people
Romanian male weightlifters
Doping cases in weightlifting
Romanian sportspeople in doping cases
Sportspeople banned for life
European Weightlifting Championships medalists
World Weightlifting Championships medalists
20th-century Romanian people
21st-century Romanian people